Andrew Brian Wathey  (born 19 July 1958) was the Vice-Chancellor of Northumbria University from 2008 to May 2022. He now holds the role of Chair of the National Archives’ Board.

Biography 
Wathey was educated at St Edmund Hall, Oxford, where he graduated with a BA in Music in 1979, and MA in 1983 and a doctorate in music (DPhil) in 1987. In 1999 he became Professor of Music History at Royal Holloway, University of London, where he had taught since 1989. He was Senior Vice Principal at Royal Holloway from 2006 until 2008.

In September 2008, he became the fourth Vice-Chancellor of Northumbria University. 

He left Northumbria University in May 2022, succeeded by Professor Andy Long. He now holds the position of Chair of the National Archives’ Board, which he has held since April 2022. Wathey is a co-founder of the Digital Image Archive of Medieval Music.

In July 2022, he was awarded a Honorary Doctor of Civil Law by Northumbria University in recognition of his contribution to the University, The North East and the HE sector as a whole.

Personal life
He was appointed a CBE in the 2016 New Year Honours. He married in 1995. He became an FRSA in 2005, and an FRHistS in 1986.

References

External links
 Northumbria University

 

1958 births
Living people
Academics of Northumbria University
Alumni of St Edmund Hall, Oxford
Commanders of the Order of the British Empire
English music historians
Fellows of the Royal Historical Society